Porta Obscura is the second studio album by German gothic metal band Coronatus. It contains 11 tracks plus 2 bonus tracks included in the limited edition digipak which was released along with the standard edition. Those bonus tracks are "Flos Obscura", a new recorded Latin version of the track "Dunkle Blume" from their last album, Lux Noctis, and "Volles Leben", the band's first song in its initial form with male vocals.

Reception

Porta Obscura received mixed reviews from the critics. A review by the Dutch Lords of Metal website complained about a lack of "remarkable compositions". The German edition of Metal Hammer compared the style to Nightwish with influences of medieval metal and lauded the accomplished production. Metal Perspective's reviewer called the album "below average, providing only weak, typical and uninspiring moments" while the German Sonic Seducer magazine marked a considerable improvement of the vocal arrangements compared to Coronatus' first album and praised the multiple musical hues on Porta Obscura. The Austrian webzine Stormbringer was positive about the compositions but asked for a more distinctive original input from the band.

Track listing

Personnel
Carmen R. Schäfer – vocals
Ada Flechtner – vocals
Jo Lang – guitars
Aria Keramati Noori – guitars
Fabian Merkt – keyboards & programming
Chriz diAnno – bass
Mats Kurth – drums

Info
Mastered by Mika Jussila at Finnvox Studios in Helsinki, Finland.
The songwriting started when the soprano singer Carmen R. Schäfer was pregnant. Before finishing it she gave birth to her daughter, Beatrice Anita.

References

2008 albums
Coronatus albums
Massacre Records albums